Joshua Miller (born April 17, 1954 in Providence, Rhode Island) is an American politician and a Democratic member of the Rhode Island Senate representing District 28 since January 2007.

Education
Miller graduated from Hope High School and attended the University of Rhode Island.

Political career

Early elections

When District 28 Democratic Senator Elizabeth H. Roberts ran for Lieutenant Governor of Rhode Island, Miller ran in the four-way September 12, 2006 Democratic Primary, winning with 173 votes (53.9%), and won the November 7, 2006 General election, winning with 7,744 votes (77.1%) against Republican nominee Ivan Marte. Miller was unopposed for the September 9, 2008 Democratic Primary, winning with 667 votes, and won the November 4, 2008 General election with 7,366 votes (64.9%) against Republican nominee Robert Clarkin, who had run a House seat in 2002 and 2004.

Miller was unopposed for the September 23, 2010 Democratic Primary, winning with 1,770 votes, and won the November 2, 2010 General election with 4,843 votes (56.5%) against Republican nominee Donald Normandin and Independent candidate Delores Issler. Miller and returning 2008 Republican challenger Robert Clarkin were both unopposed their September 11, 2012 primaries, setting up a rematch; Miller won the November 6, 2012 General election with 7,119 votes (69.0%) against Clarkin.

2014 Bidondi confrontation
In March 2014, Dan Bidondi of "Truthradio.com," a gun-rights activist and writer for the conspiracy theory website Infowars, approached Miller with a microphone and camera in the Rhode Island State House rotunda during a hearing on gun legislation. Bidondi had previously gained attention for showing up at news conferences on the Boston Marathon bombing to yelled out questions about whether the attack was a "false flag." In the ensuing confrontation, Miller told Bidondi to "go fuck yourself." In a statement the following day, Miller apologized, stating that "regardless of the emotions and atmosphere of the moment, it does not justify the language I used that day. Out of respect for the decorum of the State House and the constituents I represent, I offer my apologies."

Recent legislation
In 2014, he was serving as the Rhode Island Senate Health and Human Services Committee chairman. That year, he and Edith Ajello held a press conference to announce that they will introduce a bill to legalize, tax, and regulate marijuana similarly to alcohol. As of May 2017, he and Scott A. Slater were the primary sponsors of legislation to legalize marijuana.

References

External links
Official page at the Rhode Island General Assembly
Campaign site

Joshua Miller at Ballotpedia
Joshua Miller at the National Institute on Money in State Politics

1954 births
Living people
Politicians from Cranston, Rhode Island
Politicians from Providence, Rhode Island
Democratic Party Rhode Island state senators
University of Rhode Island alumni
21st-century American politicians